Dmitry Sholokhov (born Dzmitry Sholakhau, February 23, 1980) is an American Artist and Fashion Designer, best known as the winner of  tenth season of Project Runway, and the fourth season of Project Runway: All Stars.

Life and career
Dmitry Sholokhov was born in Belarus, to a physician mother and architect father of Lithuanian descent. He was a professional ballroom dancer as a teenager. He moved to New York City at the age of 18, and earned a Bachelor of Fine Arts (BFA)  in Fashion Design from Parsons School of Design.

Dmitry Sholokhov had worked for several design companies, including The Jones Group, before trying out for the tenth season of Project Runway in 2012. He then competed in and won the fourth season of Project Runway: All Stars in 2015. Since then he has worked as an instructor at his alma mater, the Parsons School of Design. He is also a Founder and a Creative Director of his  fashion label Dmitry Sholokhov.

In 2019, Sholokhov competed in Season 7 of Project Runway All Stars, that featured a cast of previous winners only from around the globe. He was the runner-up of the season.

In October 2019, Dmitry Sholokhov was named Fashion Designer Of The Year by Metropolitan Fashion Awards in Los Angeles

References

External links
 Dmitry Sholokhov - Official Website
 

Living people
1980 births
Belarusian fashion designers
Belarusian people of Lithuanian descent
Belarusian emigrants to the United Kingdom
People from Navapolatsk
LGBT fashion designers
Belarusian LGBT people
Project Runway (American series) participants
Parsons School of Design alumni
Parsons School of Design faculty
Reality show winners
21st-century LGBT people